The Alma Thomas House is an historic house, located at 1530 15th Street, N.W., in the Logan Circle neighborhood.

History
Built in 1875, by Thomas G. Allen, the Italianate row house was the residence and studio of noted African-American artist Alma Thomas (1892–1978).

Rosa Douglass Sprague, daughter to Frederick Douglass, lived at 1530 15th Street, before Alma Thomas's parents moved in, in 1907.

Noted African American artist Alma Thomas lived in the home until her death in 1978 along with a sister, J. Maurice Thomas.  John Maurice Thomas, who was named for their father, lived at the home until her death in 2004, and the home passed to a nephew, who later sold the home.

The building is listed on the National Register of Historic Places, and is a contributing property to the Greater Fourteenth Street Historic District.

See also
 National Register of Historic Places listings in the District of Columbia

References

External links
 National  Register  of  Historic  Places Registration  Form - completed 1987 form for the Alma Thomas House.
 

African-American history of Washington, D.C.
Dupont Circle
Individually listed contributing properties to historic districts on the National Register in Washington, D.C.
Houses completed in 1875
Houses on the National Register of Historic Places in Washington, D.C.
1875 establishments in Washington, D.C.